Leonard Warwick Greenwood (25 March 1899 – 20 July 1982) was an English first-class cricketer who played in five matches in the years after the First World War.

He made his debut for Oxford University against Gentlemen of England in May 1919, making 2 in his only innings; this was the first first-class game to be played after the war. The following season he appeared for Somerset against Oxford, making 16 and 0. Between 1922 and 1926 he played three times for Worcestershire, but made only 33 runs in four innings.

During World War I Greenwood was an officer in the Royal Flying Corps and then in the Royal Air Force. He was a master at Abberley Hall School near Worcester.

References

External links
 

1899 births
1982 deaths
English cricketers
Somerset cricketers
Worcestershire cricketers
Oxford University cricketers
Alumni of New College, Oxford
Royal Flying Corps officers
British Army personnel of World War I
Schoolteachers from Worcestershire